The Stonewall Book Award is a set of three literary awards that annually recognize "exceptional merit relating to the gay/lesbian/bisexual/transgender experience" in English-language books published in the U.S. They are sponsored by the Rainbow Round Table (RRT) of the American Library Association (ALA) and have been part of the American Library Association awards program, now termed ALA Book, Print & Media Awards, since 1986 as the single Gay Book Award.

The three award categories are fiction and nonfiction in books for adults, distinguished in 1990, and books for children or young adults, from 2010. The awards are named for Barbara Gittings, Israel Fishman, and (jointly) Mike Morgan and Larry Romans. In full they are the Stonewall Book Award-Barbara Gittings Literature Award, the Stonewall Book Award-Israel Fishman Non-Fiction Award, and the Stonewall Book Awards – Mike Morgan & Larry Romans Children's & Young Adult Literature Award.

Finalists have been designated from 1990, and termed "Honor Books" from 2001. Currently a panel of librarians selects five finalists in each award category and subsequently selects one winner. The winners are announced in January and each receives a plaque and $1000 cash prize during the ALA Annual Conference in June or July. Winners are expected to attend and to give acceptance speeches.

The ALA solicits book suggestions each to be accompanied by a brief statement in favor of the book. Anyone may suggest a title for consideration. However, the publisher of a proposed title, agents or representatives of the author, or anyone else who may stand to gain directly from the nomination of the book should disclose this information via the online form.

Eligible books should be original works published in the U.S. and Canada during the preceding year, including "substantially changed new editions" and "English-language translations of foreign-language books".

History
The Gay Book Award was inaugurated in 1971, recognizing Patience and Sarah, a historical novel by Alma Routsong (writing as Isabel Miller), which had been self-published by Routsong in 1969. Originally it was a "grassroots acknowledgment" of GLBT publishing, and there were "only a handful" of books to consider annually. By 1995, there were more than 800.

In 2002, the awards, then two, were jointly named after the site of the 1969 Stonewall riots.

Award name and categories
 1971–1986 Gay Book Award
 1987–1989 Gay and Lesbian Book Award
 1990–1993 Gay and Lesbian Book Award (nonfiction and literature categories)
 1994–1998 Gay, Lesbian, and Bisexual Book Award (nonfiction and literature)
 1999–2001 Gay, Lesbian, Bisexual, and Transgender Book Award (nonfiction and literature)
 2002–2010 Stonewall Book Award-Barbara Gittings Literature Award and the Stonewall Book Award-Israel Fishman Non-Fiction Award.
 2010–present Stonewall Book Award-Barbara Gittings Literature Award, the Stonewall Book Award-Israel Fishman Non-Fiction Award, and the Stonewall Book Award-Mike Morgan and Larry Romans Children's & Young Adult Literature Award.

From 1986, the Gay Book Award and its descendants have been part of the American Library Association awards program, now termed ALA Book, Print & Media Awards.

Recipients

See also
LGBT literature
Libraries and the LGBT community

Notes

References

External links
 Stonewall Book Awards List
American Library Association's Rainbow Round Table (RRT)

 
American literary awards
LGBT literature in the United States
LGBT literary awards
Awards established in 1971
American Library Association awards
American librarianship and human rights
1971 establishments in the United States
English-language literary awards